Boris Dugdanovich Budayev (born 19 July 1957) is a Uzbekistani wrestler. He competed in the men's freestyle 74 kg at the 1996 Summer Olympics.

References

External links
 

1957 births
Living people
Uzbekistani male sport wrestlers
Olympic wrestlers of Uzbekistan
Wrestlers at the 1996 Summer Olympics
Soviet male sport wrestlers